Bath FM was a local independent radio station based at the former Weston railway station in Bath, England. The station was launched in November 1999 and closed on 24 March 2010.

The station broadcast to an area with a population of 104,000. In September 2008, RAJAR figures gave the station a weekly audience reach of 14% and an audience share of 2.7%
In December 2008, after the acquisition by South West Radio Ltd, listening figures increased to an audience reach of 15% and an audience share of 3.4%.

Ownership + The Great Radio Ownership Crisis of 2008-2010
Bath FM, initially an independent station, was launched in November 1999 as an alternative to GWR FM Bath, which also served the city. In February 2006, Bath FM was taken over by The Local Radio Company (TLRC). In June 2008, TLRC sold Bath FM, along with nearby stations Brunel FM and 3TR FM, to Laser Broadcasting. On 28 October 2008, Laser Broadcasting were placed into administration.

On 29 October 2008, it was announced that Bath FM had been sold to South West Radio Ltd. Bath FM was sold alongside Brunel FM, 3TR FM, and two Quaywest stations, following the collapse of previous owner Laser Broadcasting.

South West Radio LTD went into administration on 4 August 2009. The assets and contracts were acquired without liability by YMC ltd who ran the stations as a group.

On 24 March 2010, the five stations were closed by administrators after multiple refusals on the part of regulator OFCOM to transfer the licenses, following a number of financial issues at the stations following TLRC's sale.

Technical

Bath FM's signal was broadcast from a transmitter based at Bathampton Down, next to the University of Bath.

On 9 September 2008, under Laser Broadcasting, Bath FM moved back into Station House and once again broadcast from the city until its closure. All broadcasting equipment and specialist wiring has now been removed from the premises, a former railway station.

References

External links
 Ofcom comment on TLRC takeover
 Media UK archive of Bath FM news

Radio stations established in 1999
Radio stations disestablished in 2010
Mass media in Bath, Somerset
Radio stations in Somerset
1999 establishments in England